Elections to Clackmannanshire Council were held on 3 May 2012, the same day as the 31 other local authorities in Scotland. The election used the five wards created under the Local Governance (Scotland) Act 2004, with 18 Councillors being elected. Each ward elected either 3 or 4 members, using the STV electoral system.

The election saw the Scottish National Party gain a seat and increase their vote share on the Council to have the same number of seats as Labour. The Scottish Conservative and Unionist Party retained their single seat on the Council and there remains a single Independent. The Scottish Liberal Democrats were wiped out losing their single seat.

After the election an SNP minority administration was formed with the support of the Independent Councillor. The Conservatives abstained on the vote.

Election result

Note: "Votes" are the first preference votes. The net gain/loss and percentage changes relate to the result of the previous Scottish local elections on 3 May 2007. This may differ from other published sources showing gain/loss relative to seats held at dissolution of Scotland's councils.

Ward results

Clackmannanshire West
2007: 2xLab; 2xSNP
2012: 2xLab; 2xSNP
2007-2012 Change: No change

Clackmannanshire North
2007: 2xSNP; 1xLab; 1xLib Dem
2012: 2xSNP; 1xLab; 1xIndependent
2007-2012 Change: Independent gain one seat from Lib Dem

Clackmannanshire Central
2007: 2xLab; 1xSNP
2012: 2xLab; 1xSNP
2007-2012 Change: No change

Clackmannanshire South
2007: 2xLab; 1xIndependent; 1xSNP
2012: 2xSNP; 2xLab
2007-2012 Change: SNP gain from Independent

Clackmannanshire East
2007: 1xCon; 1xLab; 1xSNP
2012: 1xCon; 1xSNP; 1xLab
2007-2012 Change: No change

Changes since 2012
† On 11 September 2016, Clackmannanshire North Cllr Archie Drummond joined the SNP and ceased to be an Independent.

References

2012
2012 Scottish local elections
21st century in Clackmannanshire